Prophetstown Township is located in Whiteside County, Illinois, United States. As of the 2010 census, its population was 2,615 and it contained 1,162 housing units.

Geography

Demographics

References

External links

Townships in Whiteside County, Illinois
Townships in Illinois